There have been two baronetcies created for persons with the surname Congreve, both in the Baronetage of the United Kingdom. Both creations are extinct.

The Congreve Baronetcy, of Walton in the County of Stafford, was created in the Baronetage of the United Kingdom on 7 December 1812 for William Congreve, best remembered for his innovations in the production of gunpowder. He was succeeded by his son, William, the second Baronet, who gained fame as the inventor of the Congreve rocket. The title is presumed to have become extinct on the death of the third Baronet some time around 1887.

The Congreve Baronetcy, of Congreve in the County of Stafford, was created in the Baronetage of the United Kingdom on 30 June 1927 for Lieutenant-Commander Geoffrey Congreve. He was the son of General Sir Walter Congreve and the younger brother of Billy Congreve. The title became extinct when Congreve was killed in a commando raid on the French coast in 1941.

Congreve baronets, of Walton (1812)
Sir William Congreve, 1st Baronet (1743–1814)
Sir William Congreve, 2nd Baronet (1772–1828)
Sir William Augustus Congreve, 3rd Baronet (1827–1887?)

Congreve baronets, of Congreve (1927)
Sir Geoffrey Cecil Congreve, 1st Baronet (1897–1941)

References

Extinct baronetcies in the Baronetage of the United Kingdom